Max Weißkirchen (born 18 October 1996) is a German badminton player. He participated at the 2014 Summer Youth Olympics in Nanjing, China. Weißkirchen won gold and silver medals at the 2015 European Junior Championships in mixed doubles and boys' singles events respectively.

Achievements

European Junior Championships 
Boys' singles

Mixed doubles

BWF International Challenge/Series (1 title, 5 runners-up) 
Men's singles

Mixed doubles

  BWF International Challenge tournament
  BWF International Series tournament
  BWF Future Series tournament

References

External links 
 
 
 
 

1996 births
Living people
Sportspeople from Bonn
German male badminton players
Badminton players at the 2014 Summer Youth Olympics